The 2018 Finder Darts Masters was a major darts tournament run by the British Darts Organisation. It was held between 7 and 9 December 2018 at Hotel Zuiderduin, Egmond aan Zee.

Prize money

Men

Qualifiers

Seeds
  Jim Williams
  Willem Mandigers
  Mark McGeeney
  Richard Veenstra
  Derk Telnekes
  Scott Mitchell
  Glen Durrant
  Chris Landman

Other qualifiers
  Gary Robson
  Wesley Harms
  Dean Reynolds
  Michael Unterbuchner
  Scott Waites
  Conan Whitehead
  Wayne Warren
  Jeffrey Van Egdom
  Jeffrey Sparidaans
  Andy Hamilton
  Ross Montgomery
  Daniel Day
  Tony O'Shea
  Martin Adams
  Martijn Kleermaker
  Wouter Vaes

Group stage

Group A

Group B

Group C

Group D

Group E

Group F

Group G

Group H

Knockout phase

Women

Qualifiers

Seeds
  Deta Hedman
  Aileen de Graaf

Other Qualifiers
  Sharon Prins
  Astrid Trouwborst
  Lisa Ashton
  Fallon Sherrock

Group stage

Group A

Group B

Final

Youth
Source:

Qualifiers
  Lars Plaisier
  Jurjen van der Velde
  Keane Barry
  Nathan Girvan
  Levy Frauenfelder
  Kevin Lasker

Group stage

Group A

Group B

Final

References

2018
Finder Darts Masters
Finder Darts Masters
Finder Darts Masters